Genetikk is a German hip hop group from Saarbrücken. Members Kappa and Sikk formed the group in 2009 and have since released nine studio albums.

History
Karuzo and Sikk are from Saarbrücken. The duo got to know each other in school and started recording music. In the process, a hip hop group with constantly changing members was formed. The debut album Foetus was recorded in Paris and released for download in October 2010. It was rated by critics as presenting a Realo-Gangster charme and comical exaggeration of the own character. Moreover, the style alludes to the appearance of the hip hop group Insane Clown Posse which represent Juggalos.

Their second album was announced in spring 2011 with music video releases of the singles Inkubation, Genie und Wahnsinn and Konichiwa Bitches. The latter one was later removed. After signing to Düsseldorf-based label Selfmade Records in late 2011, the album Voodoozirkus was released in February 2012. Performing as a supporting act for GZA and French rapper Sefyu in the same month, the rap group's popularity increased and album sales thrived. Genetikk signed a publication contract with BMG and performed with 257ers and DCVDNS for the tour Menschen, Tiere, AKKtraktionen.

On 21 June 2013, the group's third album D.N.A., which stands for Da Neckbreaker Aliens, including the singles D.N.A. and Champions was released and reached the top of the German album charts.  The album also includes contributions by rapper RZA and label partner Kollegah.

In March 2015, the track list for their fourth album Achter Tag, was announced. The songs "Achter Tag/Dago", "Wünsch dir was", "Caput Mundis" and "Überüberstyle" were released on YouTube to promote their album. "Achter Tag" was released on 8 May 2015 and reached the top of the German, Austrian and Swiss album charts.

They also collaborated with Kollegah, Favorite, 257ers and Karate Andi on the third Selfmade Records sampler "Chronik III", which was released on 9 October 2015 and reached the top of the German charts as well.

"Wünsch dir was" was featured as a song on the 2015 video game Need For Speed.

A new album was released on 2 December 2016 called "FUKK GENETIKK". Songs include "Jordan Belfort" and others.

Discography

Albums

Studio albums

Extended plays

Singles

References

External links 
  (in German)
 Page on Selfmade Records website (in German)

German hip hop groups
Masked musicians